Hov Dås (before 1948 spelled Hov Daas) is a large hill in Denmark of prehistoric and bronze age interest because it contains a couple of long barrows type of bronze and prehistoric burial types, and tumulus on top. It is situated in Jutland, in the community of Thisted. It is 54 m wide and 3 m high.

References

External links 
 

Tumuli in Denmark
Prehistoric sites in Denmark
Thisted